A bilateral monopoly is a market structure consisting of both a monopoly (a single seller) and a monopsony (a single buyer).

Overview
In a standard monopoly structure, the monopolist sells to multiple buyers with no market power, thereby giving the monopolist the power to set their own price and quantity to optimise their profits. The same power imbalance occurs in a monopsony where the monopsonist is the only buyer in a market of many sellers.

Bargaining between buyers and sellers is in all essentials similar to bargaining between two people. So most of the conclusions of the bilateral monopoly theory hold whether or not the bargaining parties are monopolists in the strict sense of the word. As a result, the theory of bilateral monopoly and the theory of bargaining are identical. Furthermore, whether or not the negotiation parties are monopolists in the strict sense of the term, most of the implications of the bilateral monopoly theory hold true. Thus, the theory of bilateral monopoly might also be referred to as the theory of bilateral oligopoly, or theory of bilaterally constrained competition, or the theory of bargaining. However, we will use the term bilateral monopoly because it is the conventional and widely understood phrase.

A bilateral monopoly requires the cooperation of both the monopolist and monopsonist to maximise their respective profits. Arthur Lyon Bowley argued that both parties follow a price leadership strategy in which the seller sets the price to maximise their profits and the buyer responds by setting the quantity to maximise their profits. This strategy can be analysed using the theory of Nash bargaining games, and market price and output will be determined by forces like bargaining power of both buyer and seller, with a final price settling in between the two sides' points of maximum profit. A bilateral monopoly model is often used in situations where the switching costs of both sides are prohibitively high.

The lack of alternatives within a given market gives way for vertical integration where the monopolist and monopsonist merge to control both upstream and downstream entities. An example of a monopolist using vertical integration to maximise their control is Standard Oil in the United States which is best known for its monopoly of oil production and refinery in the late nineteenth and early twentieth century. The market power that Standard Oil acquired from its monopoly of oil production allowed it to exert unreasonable control over the railroads used to transport their oil. Standard Oil forced the railroads to exclusively service Standard Oil's business and to lower their prices otherwise Standard Oil would pull all of their business from that railroad company. In this case, the bilateral monopoly quickly became a structure of vertical integration with Standard Oil being both the monopolist and monopsonist.

In economic theory, the price in a bilateral monopoly market was initially considered to be indeterminate. This is because the final price in a bilateral monopoly market is generated by the bargaining process between buyers and sellers. The relative bargaining power of buyers and sellers reduces this uncertainty to a bounded solution. The upper bound is the price that would be fixed if the seller had no bargaining power, and the lower bound is the price that would be fixed if the buyer had no bargaining power. If the price of the market is set in this range, the market is considered to be a bilateral monopoly.

Economic theory suggests that a market with a bilateral monopoly may be relatively less efficient than a typical market with multiple buyers and sellers, and the quantity of products is relatively lower than in a market with multiple sellers. Consider the case of fixed marginal costs. The buyer's value is $2 or $4. Multiple sellers' competition may result in a price below $2 and an efficient level of trade. In contrast, if there is only one seller, the seller will choose to offer the goods at the maximum price of $4 to maximize profit. The buyer's actual value will be $2 half of the time, and no trade will take place, demonstrating the inefficiency of a single provider in comparison to several suppliers.

Examples
Market pricing and output will be controlled by forces such as negotiating strength of both buyer and seller, with a final price settling in between the two sides' points of greatest profit, according to the theory of Nash bargaining games. In cases where both parties' switching costs are unacceptably large, a bilateral monopoly model is commonly utilized.
A labor union (a monopolist supplier of labor) faces a single employer in a factory town (a monopsonist of employment).
The United States Navy is the only buyer of nuclear-powered aircraft carriers in the United States, and Huntington Ingalls Industries is the only seller due to the United States Department of Defense only issuing a license to Huntington Ingalls Industries.
The South Korean economy has also been called out for being one entire bilateral monopoly due to the existence of Chaebols where giant mega-corporations control both the sale of products (e.g. consumer goods only manufactured by Samsung Electronics or LG or cars manufactured by or in a partnership with Kia/Hyundai or Renault Samsung Motors) as well as being the sole employer of most people besides the government.
Lignite (brown coal) mines and lignite power stations are a bilateral monopoly as the cost of transportation of lignite prohibits long distance transport. As such, power stations are located next to lignite mines and are the only buyer of lignite.

See also 
 Industrial organization
 New institutional economics
 Transaction cost

References 

Monopoly (economics)